Philippe Debureau (born 25 April 1960) is a French handball player who competed in the 1992 Summer Olympics.

He was born in Hinges.

In 1992 he was a member of the French handball team which won the bronze medal. He played five matches and scored seven goals.

External links
profile

1960 births
Living people
French male handball players
Olympic handball players of France
Handball players at the 1992 Summer Olympics
Olympic bronze medalists for France
Olympic medalists in handball
Medalists at the 1992 Summer Olympics